John Sanbourne Bockoven (1915-2007) was an American psychiatrist. He served as an officer in the U.S. Army  Medical Corps of the during World War II.

He  served as a research psychiatrist at Boston Psychopathic Hospital, as  Clinical Director and then Acting Superintendent of Butler Health Center in Providence, Rhode Island, as  Superintendent  at the Cushing Hospital at Framingham, Massachusetts,   and finally, starting in 1966,  Superintendent of the Dr. Harry C. Solomon Mental Health Center in Lowell, Massachusetts

He taught at the Harvard Medical School and the University of Vermont College of Medicine. He was interested in the history of mental hospital care, and wrote  extensively about it. In 1964 he received a Certificate in Commendation from the American Psychiatric Association for his service as Chairman of the Committee on History of Psychiatry.

He was born in North Dakota and died in Concord, Massachusetts.

Publications
Moral Treatment in Community Mental Health, Springer, 1972. OCLC 641639244    
Moral Treatment in American Psychiatry.  New York: Springer, 1983. (in 304 libraries according to WorldCat    )

References

1915 births
University of Vermont faculty
American psychiatrists
American hospital administrators
20th-century American historians
American male non-fiction writers
Harvard Medical School faculty
2007 deaths
20th-century American male writers
United States Army personnel of World War II